NF is the second extended play by American rapper NF. Capitol Christian Music Group alongside Sparrow Records released the project on August 5, 2014. NF worked with Thomas James "Tommee" Profitt on the production of it.

Reception

Specifying in a four star review by CCM Magazine, Matt Conner responds, "NF, Nate's six-song EP, is a stellar first step." Kevin Hoskins, indicating for Jesus Freak Hideout in a three and a half star review, recognizes, the album is "He can spit, the beats are stellar, and he is as emotionally charged for God and willing to be as honest as they come." Signaling in a three and a half star review from New Release Tuesday, Mark Ryan realizes, "What we have here is a raw rapper with a penchant for lyricism and, as an added bonus, he can sing his own hooks."

Track listing

Charts

References

2014 debut EPs
Christian hip hop EPs
NF (rapper) albums